The General Bank of India was a bank founded in the 18th century and lasted till 1791.

History 

The Bank was the sixth oldest bank in India.

In the 18th century, Calcutta had become a centre of trade and commercial activities of the East India Company. Most of British commercial agencies, businesses, export houses and private industry were headquartered in Calcutta. All of these businesses were staffed and managed by British expatriates in India. A need was felt for a bank which would cater to the needs of these people. As a result, the General Bank of India was founded in 1786 in Calcutta.

The bank was staffed by employees, who were mostly British nationals and drawn mainly from the East India Company.

Legacy 

The bank is largely notable for being the sixth oldest bank in India.

The bank also played a major role in making the city of Calcutta, the economic and financial centre of British India. Calcutta thus came to be known as the second city of the British Empire.

See also

Indian banking
List of banks in India
List of oldest banks in India

References

External links
 History of the Bank
 History of the Bank

Defunct banks of India
Companies based in Kolkata
Banks established in 1786